Georg Thieme (2 July 1860, Leipzig – 26 December 1925, Leipzig) was a German publisher, notable for founding the Georg Thieme Verlags in 1886 - it still operates as Thieme Medical Publishers. He was the son of the industrialist Alfred Thieme and elder brother of the art historian Ulrich Thieme.

Bibliography
 Katrin Löffler, Iris Schöpa, Heidrun Sprinz; Der Leipziger Südfriedhof – Geschichte / Grabstätten / Grabdenkmäler; Edition Leipzig in der Dornier Medienholding Berlin, 1. Auflage 2000; 

1860 births
1925 deaths
German publishers (people)
Businesspeople from Leipzig